A dungkhag (་ drungkhak) is a sub-district of a dzongkhag (district) of Bhutan. The head of a dungkhag is a Dungpa. As of 2007, nine of the twenty dzongkhags had from one to three dungkhags, with sixteen dungkhags in total.

History
Under Bhutan's first government Act of decentralization, the Dzongkhag Yargay Tshogdu Chathrim of 2002 Dungpas were given a non-voting seat on the Dzongkhag Yargay Tshogdu. Under the Local Government Act of 2007, dungkhags provided general administration and coordination for two or more gewogs. As a result, some gewogs within a given district were directly subordinate to dungkhags while others are directly subordinate to dzongkhags. Dungkhag Administrations guided and supported their constituent Gewog Administrations and implemented the decisions of the Dzongkhag Tshogdu. Dungpas were administrative executives that reported directly to the Dzongkhag administration. The Dungpa was empowered to attend the meetings of the Gewog Tshogdes as a non-voting member.

In addition to administrative functions, Dungkhag Courts were codified under the Judicial Act of 2007 and Constitution of 2008 as a court of first instance within the judicial system of Bhutan. These courts are subordinate to Dzongkhag Courts.

Under the Local Government Act of 2009, the administrative status of dungkhags is eschewed, and Dungpas are not specified to attend meetings of the Dzongkhag Tshogdu. The repeal of the Local Government Act of 2007 means that although dungkhags are no longer legal administrative divisions, they remain judicial and law enforcement jurisdictions under the Constitution.

List of dungkhags
The internal territorial divisions of Bhutan, including dungkhags and their constituent gewogs, are subject to alteration by the Government of Bhutan through creation, transfer, and merger. For example, in 2002, there were 199 gewogs in the 20 dzongkhags; by 2005, there were 205. In 2007, Lhamoizingkha Dungkhag was formally transferred from Sarpang Dzongkhag to Dagana Dzongkhag, affecting the town of Lhamoizingkha and three constituent gewogs – Lhamoizingkha, Deorali and Nichula (Zinchula) – that formed the westernmost part of Sarpang and became the southernmost part of Dagana. Such changes are reflected in the list below.

As of 2007, there were 16 dungkhags among nine of twenty Bhutanese dzongkhags.

See also
Dzongkhag (list)
Gewog
Chiwog
Villages of Bhutan
Dungkhag Court
Local Government Act of Bhutan 2009

References

Subdivisions of Bhutan
Types of administrative division